Ramsoo is a village and municipality in Ramban district of the Indian union territory of Jammu and Kashmir. The town is located 22 kilometres from the district headquarters Ramban.

Transport

Road
Ramsoo is well-connected by road to other places in Jammu and Kashmir and India by the NH 44.

Rail
The nearest major railway station to Ramsoo is Jammu Tawi railway station located at a distance of 150 kilometres.

Air
The nearest airport to Gundna is Jammu Airport located at a distance of 147 kilometres and is a 4.5-hour drive.

See also
Jammu and Kashmir
Ramban district
Ramban

References

Villages in Ramban district